Hybrid intelligent system denotes a software system which employs, in parallel, a combination of methods and techniques from artificial intelligence subfields, such as:
 Neuro-symbolic systems
 Neuro-fuzzy systems
 Hybrid connectionist-symbolic models
 Fuzzy expert systems
 Connectionist expert systems
 Evolutionary neural networks
 Genetic fuzzy systems
 Rough fuzzy hybridization
 Reinforcement learning with fuzzy, neural, or evolutionary methods as well as symbolic reasoning methods.

From the cognitive science perspective, every natural intelligent system is hybrid because it performs mental operations on both the symbolic and subsymbolic levels. For the past few years, there has been an increasing discussion of the importance of A.I. Systems Integration. Based on notions that there have already been created simple and specific AI systems (such as systems for computer vision, speech synthesis, etc., or software that employs some of the models mentioned above) and now is the time for integration to create broad AI systems. Proponents of this approach are researchers such as Marvin Minsky, Ron Sun, Aaron Sloman,  and Michael A. Arbib.

An example hybrid is a hierarchical control system in which the lowest, reactive layers are sub-symbolic. The higher layers, having relaxed time constraints, are capable of reasoning from an abstract world model and performing planning.

Intelligent systems usually rely on hybrid reasoning processes, which include induction, deduction, abduction and reasoning by analogy.

See also
 AI alignment
 AI effect
 Applications of artificial intelligence
 Artificial intelligence systems integration
 Intelligent control

 Lists
 List of emerging technologies
 Outline of artificial intelligence

Notes

References 
 R. Sun & L. Bookman, (eds.), Computational Architectures Integrating Neural and Symbolic Processes. Kluwer Academic Publishers, Needham, MA. 1994. http://www.cogsci.rpi.edu/~rsun/book2-ann.html 
 S. Wermter and R. Sun, (eds.) Hybrid Neural Systems. Springer-Verlag, Heidelberg. 2000. http://www.cogsci.rpi.edu/~rsun/book4-ann.html 
 R. Sun and F. Alexandre, (eds.) Connectionist-Symbolic Integration. Lawrence Erlbaum Associates, Mahwah, NJ. 1997.
 Albus, J. S., Bostelman, R., Chang, T., Hong, T., Shackleford, W., and Shneier, M. Learning in a Hierarchical Control System: 4D/RCS in the DARPA LAGR Program NIST, 2006
A.S. d'Avila Garcez, Luis C. Lamb & Dov M. Gabbay. Neural-Symbolic Cognitive Reasoning. Cognitive Technologies, Springer (2009). .
 International Journal of Hybrid Intelligent Systems http://www.softcomputing.net/ijhis/
 http://www.iospress.nl/html/14485869.php 
 International Conference on Hybrid Intelligent Systems http://his.hybridsystem.com/
 HIS'01: http://www.softcomputing.net/his01/
 HIS'02: https://web.archive.org/web/20060209160923/http://tamarugo.cec.uchile.cl/~his02/
 HIS'03: http://www.softcomputing.net/his03/
 HIS'04: https://web.archive.org/web/20060303051902/http://www.cs.nmt.edu/~his04/
 HIS'05: https://web.archive.org/web/20051223013031/http://www.ica.ele.puc-rio.br/his05/
 HIS'06 https://web.archive.org/web/20110510025133/http://his-ncei06.kedri.info/
 HIS'7 September 17–19, 2007, Kaiserslautern, Germany, http://www.eit.uni-kl.de/koenig/HIS07_Web/his07main.html
 hybrid systems resources: http://www.cogsci.rpi.edu/~rsun/hybrid-resource.html 

Artificial intelligence